Jozef Štibrányi (born 11 January 1940 in Vlčkovce) is a former Slovak football player. He is nicknamed Vasil.

During his club career he mostly played for FC Spartak Trnava. He earned 9 caps for the Czechoslovakia national football team, and was part of the second-placed team at the 1962 FIFA World Cup, where he scored one goal.

External links
 ČMFS entry 

1940 births
Living people
Slovak footballers
FC Spartak Trnava players
MFK Vítkovice players
Czechoslovak footballers
Czechoslovakia international footballers
1962 FIFA World Cup players
People from Trnava District
Sportspeople from the Trnava Region
Association football midfielders
Slovak people of Hungarian descent